Paula Findlen (born 1964) is the Ubaldo Pierotti Professor of Italian History, the director of the Suppes Center for the History and Philosophy of Science and Technology, and the director of the SIMILE Program, all at Stanford University.

Findlen received a bachelor's degree in Medieval/Renaissance Studies from Wellesley College in 1984, and from the University of California, Berkeley earned a master's in History in 1985 and a PhD in 1989. Her book, 'Possessing Nature: Museums, Collecting, and Scientific Culture in Early Modern Italy' was given the Pfizer Award in 1996 by the History of Science Society.

In 2016, Findlen gave the inaugural Rosalinde and Arthur Gilbert Lecture on the history of collecting, at London V&A. That same year, she also received the Premio Galileo prize, an annual, international award for contributions to understanding Italian culture.

Selected publications
Possessing Nature: Museums, Collecting, and Scientific Culture in Early Modern Italy
Mapping the Republic of Letters, with Caroline Winterer, Giovanna Ceserani
and Dan Edelstein
Early Modern Things: Objects and their Histories, 1500-1800
Gusto for Things
"Why Go to Grad School?" https://www.chronicle.com/article/Why-Go-to-Grad-School-/149957

References

1964 births
Living people
American women historians
American historians of science
Stanford University faculty
University of California, Berkeley alumni
Wellesley College alumni
21st-century American women